Water Park Tycoon is a sandbox video game where the player's goal is to create a successful water park. It was developed and published by Astragon.

Gameplay 

The goal of the game is to build a successful water park. When a world is launched, there is a large fenced-in space where the player can build their water park, as well as a ticket booth. The park is closed when by default, but the player can open it at any time, which will cause guests to be able to enter the park. Several types of pools, water slides, playground rides, food stalls, and vegetation are available for the player to improve the park. When any of these are bought, the player will lose money. Money is gained when guests buy food or drink, or purchase a park ticket. The player can set the price of both of these, but if the price is too high, guests will not want to purchase an article or ticket, and the park rating will drop.

The park rating is represented by a star with a number in it as well as a percentage on the top right of the screen. The percentage and number start off at 0, but as the water park is expanded and improved, the percentage will go up, causing the number to come up too. Once the percentage gets to 90%, the number will be up to 5, which is the highest it can go. In addition to building attractions and stalls, the player can also hire staff. These staff will perform tasks such as cleaning up the park, improving safety, and watering plants. Staff help improve the park greatly, and will therefore increase the park rating. However, the more staff the player hires, the more money they lose at the end of an in-game month.

References 

Business simulation games
Video games developed in Germany
Windows games
Windows-only games
2014 video games